Rosenwald is a surname. It may also refer to:

 Mount Rosenwald, Queen Maud Mountains, Antarctica
 Rosenwald School (Delight, Arkansas), on the National Register of Historic Places
 Rosenwald High School (New Roads, Louisiana), a former school
 Rosenwald Building, Albuquerque, New Mexico, on the National Register of Historic Places
 Rosenwald Hall, Dillard University, New Orleans, Louisiana
 Rosenwald (film), a 2015 documentary

See also
 Rosenwald School, a name given to thousands of schools, shops, and teachers' homes in the United States which were built primarily for the education of African-American children in the South in the early 20th century
 Rosenwald Fund